Martenne Julia Bettendorf (born April 1, 1994, in Portland, Oregon) is an American volleyball player .

Career
Bettendorf started playing volleyball at Portland Central Catholic High School. During her studies at the University of Oregon, she played for the University of Oregon Ducks team. In 2014, she was nominated as an All American player. Following that, Bettendorf made the jump to a professional volleyball player and received a contract with Azerrail Baku in Azerbaijan. With Baku she finished second in the national championship. She joined the international club in 2016/17 in the Champions League but missed as the worst runner-up the entry into the play-offs. For the 2017/18 season, she became the successor of her compatriot Ariel Gebhardt, a German champion SSC Palmberg Schwerin.

References

External links

 Profile at the Volleypro Agency

Sportspeople from Portland, Oregon
1994 births
Living people
American women's volleyball players
Central Catholic High School (Portland, Oregon) alumni
Opposite hitters
Oregon Ducks women's volleyball players
Expatriate volleyball players in Azerbaijan
American expatriate sportspeople in Azerbaijan
American expatriate volleyball players